Supaul Lok Sabha constituency is one of the 40 Lok Sabha (parliamentary) constituencies in Bihar state in eastern India. This constituency came into existence in 2008 as a part of the implementation of delimitation of parliamentary constituencies based on the recommendations of the Delimitation Commission of India constituted in 2002.

Assembly segments
Presently, Supaul Lok Sabha constituency comprises the following six Vidhan Sabha (legislative assembly) segments:

Members of Parliament

Election results

General Elections 2019

General Elections 2014

See also
 Supaul district
 List of Constituencies of the Lok Sabha

References 

Lok Sabha constituencies in Bihar
Politics of Supaul district
Politics of Madhepura district
Politics of Saharsa district